Arnaud Anastassowa (born January 23, 1988) is a French professional football defender who plays for US Forbach.

Career 
Anastassowa began his career by US Forbach before being transferred in 2005 to FC Metz. After four years he was released from Metz and signed on 4 July 2009 with F91 Dudelange.

References

1988 births
Living people
People from Forbach
French footballers
French people of Bulgarian descent
FC Metz players
Ligue 1 players
Association football defenders
Sportspeople from Moselle (department)
Footballers from Grand Est
French expatriate sportspeople in Luxembourg
French expatriate footballers
Expatriate footballers in Luxembourg